Nutbourne may refer to:

 Nutbourne, Chichester, West Sussex, England
 Nutbourne, Horsham, West Sussex, England